Hum Bhi Insaan Hain is a 1989 Indian Hindi-language masala film directed by Manivannan and produced by Suresh Bokadia. It stars Sanjay Dutt, Jackie Shroff, Raj Babbar, Jaya Prada, Neelam and Sonam. It was given a superhit verdict at the box office. The film was a remake of the director's own Tamil film Muthal Vasantham.

Plot

Dharampal presides over his palatial home and his family with dictatorial ruthlessness. His wife is terrified of him. His older daughter Radha would rather die than marry without his permission. Naturally, when his younger daughter, Rekha falls in love with a mere labourer, Bhola, this angers Dharampal to such an extent that he implicates Bhola for raping and abducting her, and forces her to testify against Bhola in court, and she does so. When Shankar and his wife attempt to help Bhola and Rekha, Dharampal has his men chop off both of Shankar's arms. The only one who could stand up to Dharampal is Kishanlal, his daughter's former lover, but how long will Dharampal tolerate him?

Cast
 Sanjay Dutt... Bhola 
 Jackie Shroff... Kishanlal
 Jaya Prada... Radha
 Neelam... Rekha 
 Raj Babbar... Shankar
 Sonam... Shankar's wife 
 Kader Khan... Dharampal 
 Asrani... Munimji

Soundtrack

References

External links

1980s Hindi-language films
1989 films
Films scored by Bappi Lahiri
Hindi remakes of Tamil films
Films directed by Manivannan
1980s masala films